"Driver 8" is the second single from American musical group R.E.M.'s third album, Fables of the Reconstruction. Released in September 1985, the song peaked at number 22 on the U.S. Billboard Mainstream Rock Tracks chart. It was not released in Europe and did not chart in the United States.

The song refers to the Southern Crescent, a passenger train that was operated by the Southern Railroad until 1979, and continues today (with fewer stops) as the Amtrak Crescent. The music video shows Chessie System trains running around Clifton Forge, Virginia.

Guitarist Peter Buck admitted in the liner notes for the band's 2003 compilation album In Time: The Best of R.E.M. 1988-2003 that the verse chords for the song "Imitation of Life" were unintentionally taken from the verse chords of "Driver 8."

In a Rolling Stone interview in 2009, Stipe said about his vocals: "It's like breathing - I don't think about it when I sing it. I was listening to these live tapes and thought it was a beautiful song with incredible imagery. I listen to our old albums and think, 'OK, this is where that went wrong, this is a way to improve that.' And 'Wow, that's really good. You're not the hoax you think you are.'" A harmonica was played in a mimicking fashion to sound like a train whistle.

Reception
Cash Box said it is "a modulating country-folk rocker which features a thoughtful chorus hook and a soaring bridge."

Cover versions
Driver 8 was covered by Hootie and the Blowfish in 2000 on their covers-only album Scattered, Smothered and Covered after the band performed a live version of the song with R.E.M. on the UK's TFI Friday in October 1998.
Dennis "Cannonball" Caplinger's bluegrass instrumental cover appears on 2001's Pickin' on R.E.M.: The Bluegrass Tribute.
Death Cab for Cutie played the song on their 2006 UK tour for the album Plans, although they have not released an official recording of it.
Old 97's covered it on their covers-only EP Mimeograph released on July 6, 2010.
Canadian rock band The Watchmen covered the song at the Horseshoe Tavern in Toronto on September 24, 2011, shortly after news of R.E.M.'s breakup was made public. Their version was released on the download-only live album Radar Redux.
Indie rock band The Walkmen covered the song as a part of The A.V. Club's A.V. Undercover series in August 2010.
Santa Cruz Bicycles produced a mountain bike model called Driver 8. It was first released in 2009.
Love Canon covered the song on their 2018 album Cover Story.
Jason Isbell released a cover to his YouTube channel  in September 2021, and is included in the album Georgia Blue.

Track listing
All songs written by Bill Berry, Peter Buck, Mike Mills and Michael Stipe unless otherwise indicated.

7": IRS / IRS-52678 (US)
 "Driver 8" - 3:24
 "Crazy" (Pylon) - 3:05

Charts

References

1985 singles
R.E.M. songs
Songs written by Bill Berry
Songs written by Peter Buck
Songs written by Mike Mills
Songs written by Michael Stipe
I.R.S. Records singles
Song recordings produced by Joe Boyd
Songs about trains
1985 songs